Julie Lampe (a.k.a. Julie Christensen Lampe, July 13, 1870 – December 20, 1948) was a Norwegian actress.

Career
Julie Lampe made her debut in 1888 at the National Theater in Bergen and remained there until 1899. From 1901 to 1935, she was one of the leading actresses at the National Theatre in Oslo. Especially in classic comedies, she created unfailingly real characters such as Magdelone in Den sundesløse, Mette in Kjærlighet uten strømper, and Mor Aase in Peer Gynt. With warmth and a sense of reality, she also played tragic roles such as the nurse in August Strindberg's Fadren. She performed roles at the theater from 1900 to 1938, and she appeared in 165 productions during the period. She also appeared in six feature films.

Theater roles (selected)
 1900: Baldevins bryllup as Madam Sørensen
 1923: Peer Gynt as Mor Aase
 1929: Den sundesløse as Magdelone
 1931: Fadren as Amman
 1935: Kjærlighet uten strømper as Mette
 1938: Jacob von Thyboe as Leonora

Filmography
 1926: Glomdalsbruden as Old Guri
 1927: Den glade enke i Trangvik as the widow Salvesen
 1927: Troll-elgen as Turi Trefothaugen, Hans's mother 
 1931: Den store barnedåpen as Miss Jahr 
 1934: Op med hodet! as Theobald's mother
 1936: Dyrk jorden! as Øverli

References

External links
 
 Julie Lampe at Sceneweb
 Julie Lampe at Filmfront

1870 births
1948 deaths
19th-century Norwegian actresses
20th-century Norwegian actresses
Actors from Bergen